Kendall River is a small river and tributary to the Coppermine River in the Canadian Northwest Territories that connects the Dismal Lakes to the Coppermine River. John Rae (explorer) had a base camp here in 1851.

Summer flows from the Kendall represent approximately 6% of the flow of the Coppermine River.

See also
List of rivers of the Northwest Territories

References
 Coppermine River: Overview of the Hydrology and Water Quality, Indian and Northern Affairs Canada

Rivers of the Northwest Territories